Josef Holeček may refer to:

 Josef Holeček (canoeist) (1921–2005), Czechoslovakian sprint canoeist
 Josef Holeček (writer) (1853–1929), Czech writer